The name Berryessa originates from the Berreyesa family in California.

Other usages of the word may refer to things named after the family, including:
Berryessa, San Jose, a district in California
Berryessa Union School District in Berryessa, San Jose
Berryessa/North San José station, a BART station in Berryessa, San Jose
Berryessa station (VTA), a light rail station in Berryessa, San Jose
Berryessa Creek, a seasonal creek in San Jose and Milpitas, California
Lake Berryessa, Napa County, California
Berryessa Valley, California

See also 
José Berreyesa (disambiguation)